Asahi Linux is a porting project to develop support for Linux on Apple hardware, specifically Apple silicon-powered Macs, allowing them to run alternative operating systems in addition to macOS. The software design project was started and is led by Hector Martin. Work began in early 2021, a few months after Apple formally announced the transition to Apple silicon. An initial alpha release followed in 2022. The project has been made challenging by the lack of publicly available documentation of Apple's proprietary firmware.

History
Shortly after Apple announced their transition away from Intel x86 processors in late 2020, Linux creator Linus Torvalds expressed interest in Linux support for the Apple M1 Mac, but thought that the work to make this happen was too time-consuming for him to personally take on the necessary software development tasks.

Martin announced the project in December 2020 and formally started work a month later, after securing crowd-sourced funding. Alyssa Rosenzweig, who developed the open-source graphics driver stack Panfrost, joined the project to help support the Apple silicon graphics processing unit (GPU).

The developers quickly realised that just attempting to boot the Linux kernel compiled for Apple silicon's processor architecture (AArch64) would be challenging, as it involved working out the functionality of proprietary Apple code used in the boot process. The work was time-consuming and took most of the year, including submitting pull requests to the main Linux kernel developers to keep development in sync and avoid regressions. However, it subsequently led to a thorough and comprehensive explanation of the previously undocumented boot process, which Martin and others published on GitHub.

The project released an experimental alpha version of the Asahi Linux installer on March 18, 2022. The installer offers the choice of an Arch Linux ARM-based desktop or minimal environment, or a basic UEFI environment for installing OpenBSD or alternate Linux distributions with support for Apple silicon via a bootable USB drive. Despite being able to launch a UEFI shell, booting Microsoft Windows is not supported, and there are no plans to do so, as it would involve modifying the proprietary Windows kernel.

Full support for all Apple silicon-supported Macs is not expected for another year or two following the first alpha release. In July 2022, the Asahi Linux team released an update with support for the M1 Ultra, Mac Studio, and early initial support for the M2 MacBook Pro.

Support

Asahi Linux is currently considered alpha software. It can display a graphical user interface and has early support for graphics acceleration, with initial OpenGL drivers implemented for all GPUs across Apple's M-series chips. This has involved creating device drivers for Apple silicon's proprietary GPU from scratch. HDMI video output is only supported on the Apple silicon Mac mini, and there is no support for Thunderbolt video output on Apple silicon MacBooks.

The Asahi Linux kernel has been configured with support for 16 kB pages, which may result in some problems with existing software.

Reception
The project has been well received. A review in The Register said that it ran surprisingly well for alpha software that is still in development. Similarly, a review in Ars Technica was impressed by the amount of hardware that was already supported early in the project lifecycle.

See also 
 Linux on Apple devices
 Reverse engineering

References

External links 
 
 Setup video

Arch-based Linux distributions
ARM Linux distributions
Linux
Platform-specific Linux distributions